KDSM may refer to:

 KDSM-TV, a television station (channel 17 physical/16 digital) licensed to Des Moines, Iowa, United States
 the ICAO code for Des Moines International Airport
 the Korea Defense Service Medal